Nisifolo Naufahu (born 30 October 1977 in Auckland) is a Tongan former rugby union player. He played as flanker, number 8 and lock.

Career
Naufahu was first capped for Tonga during the match against Fiji in Nuku'alofa, on 25 May 2001. He was part of the 2003 Rugby World Cup roster, playing two matches in the tournament, with the pool stage match against Canada in Wollongong, on 29 October 2003 being his last test cap. At club level he played in the National Provincial Championship for Hawke's Bay and for Northland, and then, in France for RC Orléans, US Oyonnax and US Annecy.

References

External links
Nisifolo Naufahu at New Zealand Rugby Union
Nisifolo Naufahu at Itsrugby.fr
Nisifolo Naufahu international statistics at ESPN

1977 births
Living people
Rugby union players from Auckland
Tonga international rugby union players
Tongan rugby union players
Expatriate rugby union players in France
Expatriate rugby union players in New Zealand
Rugby union locks
Rugby union flankers
Rugby union number eights